Frank Joseph Perry Jr. (August 21, 1930 – August 29, 1995) was an American stage director and filmmaker. His 1962 independent film David and Lisa earned an Academy Award nomination for Best Director and Best Adapted Screenplay (written by his then-wife Eleanor Perry). The couple collaborated on five more films, including The Swimmer, Diary of a Mad Housewife, and the Emmy Award–nominated A Christmas Memory, based on a short story by Truman Capote. Perry went on to form Corsair Pictures, privately financed by United Artists Theatres, which produced Miss Firecracker and A Shock to the System, then folded. His later films include Mommie Dearest and the documentary On the Bridge, about his battle with prostate cancer.

Early life
Frank Joseph Perry Jr. was born in New York City to stockbroker Frank Joseph Perry Sr. (1905–1969) and Pauline E. Schwab (1908–1965), who worked at Alcoholics Anonymous. As a teenager, Frank Jr. began pursuing his interest in the theater with a job as a parking lot attendant for the Westport Country Playhouse in nearby Westport, Connecticut. He attended the University of Miami. Frank also studied under Lee Strasberg in New York. He produced several plays at Westport Country Playhouse and then turned for a time to producing television documentaries.

Career
A veteran of the Korean War, he returned to the entertainment industry after being discharged and made his directorial debut in 1962 with the low-budget drama film David and Lisa. Based on the novel by Theodore Isaac Rubin, the screenplay was written by his wife, Eleanor Rosenfeld, who received a nomination for an Academy Award for Writing Adapted Screenplay. A character study of two emotionally disturbed teenagers, the film was successful at the box office and met with much critical acclaim, earning him a nomination for an Academy Award for Directing. Both Perrys would eventually join the select group of non-actors awarded membership in Actors Studio. Perry went on to direct and produce a number of films, many based on literary sources or with strong literary associations, including The Swimmer, (1968) based on a John Cheever story, Last Summer (1969), and Trilogy (1969), written by Truman Capote.

Perry is known for his character studies, such as Diary of a Mad Housewife (1970). That film earned a Best Actress Oscar nomination for Carrie Snodgress, and Play It as It Lays (1972), starring Tuesday Weld, brought her a Golden Globe Best Actress nomination. Both of these films Perry produced and directed, but he is probably best remembered for directing the biographical drama Mommie Dearest, an adaptation of a biography by actress Joan Crawford's adoptive daughter. The film became a cult classic despite mixed reviews from critics; it also won the Razzie Award for worst picture, and Frank Perry was nominated for worst director, while actress Faye Dunaway received the Razzie for her performance.

Some of Perry's film-related material and personal papers are held at the Wesleyan University Cinema Archives, a collection to which scholars and media experts from around the world today have full access.

Personal life and death
In 1958, Frank married his first wife Eleanor, who was 15 years his senior and had two children in William and Ann from a previous marriage. Frank and Eleanor collaborated on many screen projects, including screenwriting the Academy Award-nominated 1962 David and Lisa (an adaptation of the novella of the same name) which came about due to Eleanor's daughter Ann bringing the novella to her mother's attention. They divorced in 1971 on grounds of incompatibility. In 1979, Eleanor Perry wrote the novel Blue Pages, based on their relationship. She died of cancer two years later, at age 66. 

In 1977, Perry married Barbara Goldsmith, founding editor of New York magazine and book author (Little Gloria...Happy at Last), whom he divorced in 1992. Soon after, he married his Aspen ski instructor, 22-years-younger Virginia Brush Ford, on June 15, 1992. His sister is pastor Mary Christine Perry, the wife of pastor Maurice Keith Hudson and mother of singers Katy Perry and David Hudson.

Perry died of prostate cancer on August 29, 1995, eight days after his 65th birthday, at Memorial Sloan Kettering Cancer Center in Manhattan. His final film, On the Bridge (1992), is an autobiographical documentary about his illness. His ashes were scattered on the mountains of Aspen, Colorado, where he lived the last three years of his life.

Author Justin Bozung has been researching and writing about Perry's life since 2013 for a planned official biography titled Character Is Story: The Life & Films of Frank Perry. As of 2021, the book has not been announced for release.

Filmography

Film

Television

References

Further reading

External links

 
Official Frank Perry Biography Facebook page

1930 births
1995 deaths
American people of German descent
American people of Portuguese descent
Deaths from cancer in New York (state)
Deaths from prostate cancer
Film directors from New York City
University of Miami alumni